The Flipper, sometimes called the Flipper Export, is a Danish sailboat that was designed by Peter Bruun as a racer and first built in 1970.

The boat is sometimes confused with the 1970 American Flipper dinghy, of which 582 were built.

Production
The design was built by Intermark Sailcraft ApS in Denmark, with 15,000 boats completed, starting in 1970, but it is now out of production.

Design
The Flipper is a recreational keelboat, built predominantly of fiberglass. It has a fractional sloop rig, a scow hull, a plumb transom, a transom-hung rudder controlled by a tiller and a removable daggerboard. It displaces .

See also
List of sailing boat types

References

External links

Video of Flipper sailing

Dinghies
1970s sailboat type designs
Sailboat type designs by Peter Bruun
Sailboat types built by Intermark Sailcraft ApS